Queen Elizabeth Composite High School, located in north Edmonton, Alberta, Canada, is a senior high school in the Edmonton Public Schools system.

History
Queen Elizabeth High School opened in the year 1958 and is named after Queen Elizabeth II.

Academic programs

The school has advanced placement classes. By participating in an AP course, the student is able to enter a world of intense discussion and thought.  AP courses give the students intellectual responsibility to think for themselves and to learn to reason, analyze, and understand.
AP allows students to undertake college level academic learning and advance into second year college or university courses which traditionally have a much smaller enrollment.
Upon successful completion of an AP course, students are eligible to receive university credit and/or advanced placement at over 4000 colleges and universities worldwide.
Research shows that AP students are more likely to graduate from university with a double major and are twice as likely to pursue a Ph.D., or studies in medicine or law.

The school has an aviation program instructing students interested in getting a private pilot license, taught by teacher/flight instructor Alan Newsome. The program covers a curriculum provided by Transport. Canada.

Athletics

The school athletic teams are called the 'Queen Elizabeth Knights', and the school colours are purple and gold. Athletic programs at the school include: Badminton, Ball Hockey, Basketball, Cross-Country, Football, Rugby, Soccer, Swimming, Team Handball, Volleyball, Weight Training, Wrestling, and curling.

Individual Support Program

The Individual Support Program, for students with severe to profound developmental delays, occupies a classroom and a small, enclosed courtyard which features a rock waterfall, wooden bridge, limestone pathway, and shrubbery, along with a pagoda with spruce log seats and teaching stone. The courtyard, created in 2005, is used as a "Living Classroom"  as well as for high school activities and community events. About 20 students are in the program, ranging in age from 14 to 20.

Judges for the 2006/07 School–Community Public Relations Awards selected "The Living Classroom," for the School Award of Excellence.

English as Second Language
English as Second Language (known as ESL) is program for newcomers from many different countries to learn English. Many students who successfully finished ESL courses will enroll to regular dash two classes.
If you are interested in different languages you may take Spanish, Punjabi, French and Arabic

Notable alumni
Daniela Andrade, musician
Bill Bonko, politician
Jim Leech, former President & CEO, Ontario Teachers’ Pension Plan; Chancellor Emeritus Queen’s University

References

External links
 Queen Elizabeth High School Web Page

High schools in Edmonton
Educational institutions established in 1960
1960 establishments in Alberta